The Twilight Valley is the fifth studio album by Japanese group Garnet Crow. It was released on October 4, 2006 under Giza Studio label.

Background
The album includes five previously released singles.

Maboroshi has received new album mix under title album arr. Compared to the original single version, lyrics are performed in different ways and the melodies have a more psychedelic tuning.

The single Kimi no Omoi Egaita Yume Atsumeru Heaven is not included in this album, instead appearing in their first compilation album Best.

This is their first studio album which was released in two formats: regular CD edition and limited edition CD+DVD. The DVD disc contains 15 minutes of digest footage of their live performance Garnet Crow Premium Live -happy 5th anniversary-.

This is one of the two GARNET CROW studio albums (the other being Terminus) not to feature a theme song from Detective Conan. Three songs, however, were included in Anime television series MÄR.

Chart performance 
"The Twilight Valley" made its chart debut on the official Oricon Albums Chart at #4 rank for first week with 36,060 sold copies. It charted for 8 weeks and totally sold 58,190 copies.

Track listing 
All tracks are composed by Yuri Nakamura, written by Nana Azuki and arranged by Hirohito Furui.

Personnel
Credits adapted from the CD booklet of The Twilight Valley.

Yuri Nakamura - vocals, backing vocals, composing
Nana Azuki - songwriting, keyboard
Hirohito Furui - arranging, keyboard
Hitoshi Okamoto - acoustic guitar, bass
Miguel Sa' Pessoa - arranging
Katsuyuki Yoshimatu - recording engineering
Aki Morimoto - recording engineering
Akio Nakajima - mixing engineering
Minoru Toyoda - mixing engineering
Masahiro Shimada - mastering engineering
Gan Kojima - art direction
Yasuhiro Itakura - art direction
Kanonji - executive producer

Tie up 
Haredokei: opening theme for Anime television series MÄR
Rai Rai Ya: image song in TBS in program Canon Specials
Yume Hanabi: opening theme for Anime television series MÄR
Koyoi Eden no Katasumi de: ending theme for Anime television series MÄR
Maboroshi: theme song for Japanese television drama Shin: Kasouken no Onna

References 

2006 albums
Being Inc. albums
Giza Studio albums
Japanese-language albums
Garnet Crow albums
Albums produced by Daiko Nagato